Hunter Johnson (born 2 June 1994) is an American tennis player.

Johnson has a career high ATP singles ranking of World No. 1470 achieved on 24 October 2016. He also has a career high doubles ranking of World No. 250 achieved on 24 February 2020.

Johnson made his ATP main draw debut at the 2021 Delray Beach Open on hard course in Florida, where he was granted entry into the main doubles draw partnering his twin brother Yates Johnson. They were defeated in the first round by another American duo Christian Harrison and Ryan Harrison in straight sets 2–6, 2–6.

Johnson has reached 20 career doubles finals, with a record of 12 wins and 8 losses all coming at the ITF Futures level. He has yet to reach a final in singles at any level.

ATP Challenger and ITF Futures finals

Doubles: 21 (13–8)

References

External links

1994 births
Living people
American male tennis players
People from Taos, New Mexico
Sportspeople from New Braunfels, Texas
Tennis people from New Mexico
20th-century American people
21st-century American people